Nahid Afrin is an Indian playback singer who made her debut in the 2016 Bollywood film Akira starring Sonakshi Sinha in the lead role.  She first gained recognition as a singer as a participant in the 2015 edition of Indian Idol Junior.  She was also seen in the reality show Little Champs North-East in 2013 where she was runner up.

Early life
Nahid Afrin was born to Fatema Ansari and Anowar Ansari in Biswanath Chariali, Assam. She was born on 13 December 2001 and has a younger brother named Faiz Anower. Nahid started singing when she was just 3 years old. She first learnt music from "Biblee Bhagawati", her first guru. She studied music at Bhatkhande Kala Kendra in Assam. She passed her class 10 board exam from Little Star School, Biswanath Chariali. Nahid comes from a modest background as her father works in DRDA as a Junior Engineer.

Before her television appearances Nahid had performed at a number of venues in the state. She can sing in different languages including Hindi, Assamese, Western, Bengali and in many other local languages.

Music career
Afrin was the first runner up in the 2015 edition of Indian Idol Junior. She made her debut as a singer in the 2016 Hindi film Akira.

UNICEF Youth Advocate
Afrin has been appointed as the first 'Youth Advocate' of the northeastern region by UNICEF India to fight for child rights in December 2018.

Awards
  Honoured with the title SONIT KUWORI ( Princess of Sonit )
 " Achiever Award 2015 "- Pratidine Times
 "  NEEDS EXCELLENCE AWARD 2015 " as YOUTH ICON (SINGING)
 " Prerna Award " As The Promising Best Singer For The Year 2017
 " Gana Adhikari promising artist award " In The Year 2017
 " Best Female Playback Singer " 2017 for the song DHUNIYA JON - Pride East Award 2017
 " 7th Assam State Film Award 2018 " - Best Playback Singer for the song AKULI BIKULI
 " Prag Cine Awards 2019 " - Best Female Playback Singer for the song SILA

Discography

Playback singing

Patriotic songs

Album songs

Singles

References

21st-century Indian women singers
21st-century Indian singers
People from Sonitpur district
Indian Idol participants
Singers from Assam
Assamese playback singers
Living people
Women musicians from Assam
2001 births